The Carnivore diet (also called a zero carb diet) is a low-carbohydrate fad diet in which only animal products such as meat, eggs, and dairy are consumed. The carnivore diet is not supported by evidence-based medicine, and it has attracted criticism from dietitians and physicians who have stated the diet could lead to vitamin deficiencies and increase risk of chronic disease.

History 

The idea of an exclusive meat diet can be traced to the German writer Bernard Moncriff, author of The Philosophy of the Stomach: Or, An Exclusively Animal Diet in 1856, who spent a year living on only beef and milk. In the 1870s, Italian physician Arnaldo Cantani prescribed his diabetic patients an exclusive animal-based diet. In the 1880s, James H. Salisbury advocated a meat diet consisting of 2 to 4 pounds of lean beef and 3 to 5 pints of hot water daily for 4 to 12 weeks. It became known as the meat and hot water diet, or Salisbury diet.

In 2018, the carnivore diet was promoted by former orthopaedic surgeon Shawn Baker on social media and received significant media attention due to its vocal adherents Jordan Peterson and his daughter Mikhaila Peterson. Peterson and his daughter follow a strict type of carnivore diet termed the lion diet, in which only beef, salt and water is consumed.

Diet 

People following a carnivore diet consume animal-based products, such as beef, pork, poultry, and seafood. Some may eat dairy products and eggs. All fruits, legumes, vegetables, grains, nuts and seeds are strictly excluded.

Health and environmental concerns 

There is no clinical evidence that the carnivore diet provides any health benefits. Dietitians dismiss the carnivore diet as an extreme fad diet, which has attracted criticism from dietitians and physicians as being potentially dangerous to health (see ).

It also raises levels of LDL cholesterol, which increases risk of cardiovascular disease. Carnivore diets exclude essential micronutrients and antioxidants found in fruits and vegetables, they are also low in dietary fiber which can cause constipation.

A carnivore diet high in red meat increases risk of colon cancer and gout.

High protein diets containing 200-400g of protein per day may exceed the liver's capacity to convert excess nitrogen to urea. When protein intake constitutes 35% or more of total energy intake the risk increases for hyperaminoacidemia, hyperammonemia, hyperinsulinemia, nausea, diarrhea, and even death (rabbit starvation syndrom).

Criticism also derives from concerns about greenhouse gas emissions associated with large-scale livestock farming required to produce meats commercially, and the potential for such emissions to worsen climate change (see environmental impact of meat production).

See also 

Carnivore
Lectin-free diet
Monotrophic diet

References 

Fad diets
Meat-based diets